Illegal aliens is a topical subject term in the Library of Congress Subject Headings thesaurus, that is, a phrase assigned by librarians to describe the content of books and other documents in a library catalog. The subject heading became a topic of political interest in the United States in 2016, when a decision by the Library of Congress to revise the heading and replace it with the terms "unauthorized immigration" and "noncitizens" was opposed by congressional Republicans.

Background
The subject heading "Aliens, Illegal" was established by the Library of Congress in 1980 and revised to "Illegal aliens" in 1993.

The subject heading incorporates references from non-preferred forms of the term including 
"Aliens--Legal status, laws, etc.";
"Aliens, Illegal";
"Illegal aliens--Legal status, laws, etc.";
"Illegal immigrants";
"Illegal immigration"; and
"Undocumented aliens". It also references related terms such as 
"Alien detention centers" and
"Human smuggling". Associated headings include "Children of illegal aliens" and "Women illegal aliens."

Calls for different wording
In 2010, racial justice organization Race Forward debuted a campaign to "Drop the I-Word," an effort to ask media sources to no longer use the word "illegal" when referring to undocumented immigrants, arguing that using the word to describe people was dehumanizing, racially charged, and legally inaccurate. Multiple news outlets stopped using "illegal" to describe people in the early 2010s, including the Associated Press.

Student activists at Dartmouth College, including the Dartmouth Coalition for Immigration Reform, Equality and DREAMERs (CoFIRED), issued a series of racial justice demands to the Dartmouth administration in February 2014, one of which requested the term "Illegal aliens" not be used in the library's catalog. Together with Dartmouth librarians, the students from CoFIRED submitted a formal request to the Library of Congress in the summer of 2014 for the heading to be revised to "Undocumented immigrants". In February 2015, the Library of Congress announced it would not change the heading, in part because resources such as Black's Law Dictionary used "Illegal aliens" as an established term. 

Librarian activists continued to gather support to ask for the heading's revision. The Council of the American Library Association passed a resolution in January 2016 calling the term "dehumanizing, offensive, inflammatory, and even a racial slur" and urging the Library of Congress to change the subject heading to "Undocumented immigrants".

2016 announcement and subsequent developments
In March 2016, the Library of Congress announced that it would replace the heading with two new headings: "Noncitizens" and "Unauthorized immigration". Following the announcement, Republican lawmakers made multiple attempts to block the revision of the subject heading, including the introduction of a bill by U.S. Representative Diane Black requiring the Library to retain the heading. In June 2016, the House of Representatives added a provision to the 2017 appropriations bill for the legislative branch requiring the Library of Congress to retain the heading without revision. While the final bill did not require it to keep the "Illegal aliens" wording, it was required "to make publicly available its process for changing or adding subject headings".

The 2019 documentary film Change the Subject, about the students at Dartmouth College, was screened throughout the U.S.

Over forty libraries and library systems revised the heading in their local catalogs.

2021 revision
The Library of Congress Policy and Standards Division replaced the term "Aliens" with "Noncitizens" and the term "Illegal aliens" with "Illegal immigration" on November 12, 2021. Reactions to the chosen terms were mixed, with a letter signed by Senators Ted Cruz and Mike Braun calling the decision "a politically-motivated and Orwellian attempt to manipulate and control language," while some librarians expressed frustrations that the changed language remains dehumanizing.

See also 
 Library of Congress Classification

References

External links 
Change the Subject 54-minute documentary about labels, libraries, and activism (2019)
Words That Hurt: a Documentary 11-minute video from the Brooklyn Public Library (2022)

Library of Congress Classification
1980 establishments in the United States
Racism in the United States
Illegal immigration
American legal terminology
Naming controversies
2016 controversies in the United States
Political controversies in the United States
Linguistic controversies